Mary Lou Clements-Mann (September 17, 1946 – September 2, 1998) was the longtime head of the Division of Vaccine Sciences at the Johns Hopkins Bloomberg School of Public Health, and is well known for her knowledge and work in HIV and AIDS research.
She died in the 1998 crash of Swissair Flight 111 with her husband, Jonathan Mann, while traveling to a World Health Organization meeting in Geneva.

Clements-Mann graduated from Texas Tech University in 1968 and received her medical degree from the University of Texas in 1972. She also received a doctorate in tropical medicine from the University of London in 1975 and a master's degree in public health, specifically epidemiology, from Johns Hopkins University in 1979.

Career
Beginning in 1975, Clements-Mann worked as consultant to the World Health Organization's Smallpox Eradication Program in India. Later, she was an assistant professor at the University of Maryland School of Medicine from 1979 to 1985. During this time, she joined the university's Center for Vaccine Development. She later became the chief of the clinical studies section in 1985. Clements-Mann served as a member of the medical staff at Johns Hopkins Hospital and Bayview Medical Center. In 1990, she was granted tenure as a professor in the department of international health with a joint appointment in the immunology and molecular biology departments.

She was a member of the US Centers for Disease Control Advisory Committee on the Children's Vaccine Initiative and the World Health Organization's steering committee for HIV vaccine development.

Throughout her career, Clements-Mann developed an extensive bibliography with papers on vaccines for influenza, HIV, cholera, hepatitis B, respiratory syncytial virus, parainfluenza, Rocky Mountain spotted fever, rotavirus, E. coli, and typhoid.

Personal life
Clements-Mann married Jonathan Mann in December 1996.

References 

1946 births
1998 deaths
20th-century American physicians
20th-century American women physicians
Accidental deaths in Nova Scotia
Alumni of the University of London
American biologists
American public health doctors
HIV/AIDS researchers
Johns Hopkins Bloomberg School of Public Health alumni
Johns Hopkins University faculty
People from Longview, Texas
People who died at sea
Texas Tech University alumni
University of Maryland, Baltimore faculty
University of Texas alumni
Victims of aviation accidents or incidents in Canada
Victims of aviation accidents or incidents in 1998
World Health Organization officials
American officials of the United Nations
20th-century American academics
People from Columbia, Maryland
Physicians from Texas
Physicians from Maryland
Women public health doctors